Anni Neumann (born 13 November 1926) is a retired East German politician who served between 1967 and 1971 as a member of the State Council of East Germany.

Life 
Neumann was born in Stettin, Prussia, in 1926. In her early life she was an agricultural worker. Starting in the 1950s she had a shipbuilding career at Neptun Werft in Rostock, and completed a diploma at the University of Rostock (WPU) in 1961. She ultimately became director of cadre and training at the shipyard in 1971 until retiring in 1981.

Neumann joined the Free German Trade Union Federation (FDGB) in 1946, the Free German Youth (FDJ) in 1947 and Socialist Unity Party of Germany (SED) in 1949. She held an FDJ leadership position for several years.

In 1964 she became a member of the State Council, which was East Germany's collective head of state, until 1971.

References 

1926 births
Possibly living people
University of Rostock alumni
Free German Trade Union Federation members
Free German Youth members
Socialist Unity Party of Germany politicians
Members of the Volkskammer
Female members of the Volkskammer
Members of the State Council of East Germany
Recipients of the Patriotic Order of Merit in bronze
Recipients of the Medal of Merit of the GDR